John J. Jones (December 25, 1828 – February 13, 1868) was an officer in the Union Army during the American Civil War.

Biography
Jones was born on December 25, 1828, in Wales. His father was a minister of the Calvinist Methodist Church. John Jones eventually migrated to the United States of America, settling in Dodgeville, Wisconsin. 

Jones volunteered for the American Civil War and enlisted as Private in the 46th Illinois Volunteer Infantry Regiment in 1861, being commissioned as its Lieutenant Colonel in October. He took part in several battles and commanded the regiment on numerous occasions, including the battles of Shiloh and Corinth. When the war ended he was brevetted Colonel.

Jones died on February 13, 1868.

See also
Foreign enlistment in the American Civil War

References

Welsh emigrants to the United States
People from Dodgeville, Wisconsin
People of Wisconsin in the American Civil War
People of Illinois in the American Civil War
Union Army officers
1828 births
1868 deaths